Academics Stand Against Poverty (ASAP) is an international network of scholars, teachers, and students working to mobilize the resources of academia to help alleviate poverty.

Projects
ASAP is currently engaged in a range of efforts aimed at leveraging the resources of academia toward poverty alleviation around the world. Its network has been described as a group that “lies between academia and activism.  Like the latter, it aims primarily at persuading and motivating people to change their behavior.  Like the former, it does so by moral and political argument, using the distinctive skills of academics.”
ASAP’s mission is to help scholars, teachers, and students enhance their impact on poverty.  It does so by promoting collaboration among poverty-focused academics, by helping them share research on poverty with public audiences, policy makers, and NGOs, and by helping academics use their expertise to achieve an impact on global poverty through intervention projects.
ASAP's strategic plan outlines the priorities of the global organization. ASAP's first global flagship project is Global Colleagues, a program that offers one-to-one matches of poverty researchers worldwide and in which all ASAP chapters are participating.

History

ASAP was founded by a group of nine academics in six countries with the mission of helping academics make a greater impact on global poverty. Those nine academics comprised ASAP’s original board of directors. The board developed the ASAP network by holding national launch conferences in the United States at Yale University, in the United Kingdom at the University of Birmingham, in Norway at the University of Oslo, and in India at the University of Delhi in 2011. In 2012, ASAP-Canada held a national launch conference in Toronto, Canada at Ryerson University.

Structure

The board includes leading academics from a variety of fields, all with a passionate interest in poverty alleviation. the current Management Board is composed of Thomas Pogge (President), Helen Yanacopulos (Fundraising Director), Catarina Tully (Co-Chapter Lead), Mihaita Lupu (Co-chapter Lead), Daniele Botti (Treasurer), and Michal Apollo (Communications Lead). Zeke Ngcobo has served as Global Coordinator since 2022.

Global Colleagues Program

ASAP has select global flagship programs that are sustained across national and regional chapters. One of ASAP's core flagship programs, Global Colleagues, brings together researchers at an early stage in their career and provides them opportunities for strong research networks, research resources, networking and grant/funding possibilities, and mentorship opportunities with more experienced researchers that are able to offer support to their colleagues in these areas.

Global Colleagues partnerships aim to foster collaborations between earlier career scholars based in the Global South with more experienced scholars in the Global South and North. The program seeks to address poverty’s more pressing issues in a globalized world. The partnerships are two-way collaborations where scholars in the earlier stages of their career and those more experienced researchers are enabled to learn from each other.

The one-on-one partnership takes place over the course of one year and involves both parties engaging in regular contact and continual progress assessments on the achievement of pre-agreed upon mutual goals. Usually partners within the program are matched with researchers with mutual interests and across international regions as well. During the duration of the partnership, the Global Colleagues team provides support to the matched colleagues to support their goals and outcomes.

Global Colleagues is run by a team of international volunteers (lead project manager: Robert Lepenies).

Prominent participants who have been part of the program include: Jayati Ghosh, Ananya Mukherjee-Reed, Adam Chmielewski, Clemens Sedmak, Alberto Cimadamore, Ernest Marie-Mbonda, Bina Agarwal, Marcos Nobre, Barbara Harriss-White, Shalini Randeria, Else Øyen, Gerry Mackie, Thomas Pogge, João Feres Júnior, Sakiko Fukuda-Parr, Sonia Bhalotra, David Hulme.

Funding

ASAP has secured funding from numerous sources, such as the British Council, the Comparative Research Programme on Poverty (CROP) of the International Social Science Council, and the Social Sciences and Humanities Research Council of Canada. The United Kingdom launch conference was funded by CROP and the University of Birmingham School of Government and Society. Launch conferences held at the University of Oslo and University of Delhi were co-sponsored by CROP and the Centre for the Study of Mind in Nature. The launch conference held in Canada in October 2012 was funded by the Social Sciences and Humanities Research Council of Canada (SSHRC), the Office of the Vice President, Research and Innovation at Ryerson University and the Ryerson University Politics and Governance Students' Association.

Reception

A special issue of the Carnegie Council's Ethics & International Affairs focuses on ASAP’s potential, and the contribution academics in general might make toward poverty alleviation. In his article in the special issue, Martin Kirk, global campaigns director for The Rules, argues that the network has the potential to influence NGOs to adopt more effective and less paternalistic approaches to development and improve their engagement with the communities they serve. “A critical barrier to change within NGOs is the fact that existing approaches are locked into a single paradigm for what counts as required knowledge for communications and campaigns in their home markets.  Thus, a group such as Academics Stand Against Poverty could be extremely influential by making the concerted case for change, and then assisting practically with authoritative guidance.”

Oxford political theorist Simon Caney argues that ASAP can have a significant impact on poverty because academics have a high level of expertise and, in certain disciplines, possess prestige and authority that extend beyond academia, and therefore have the ability to influence others to be active in the fight against global poverty. The contribution of academics to advocacy may include persuading privileged groups to change their behaviour, the development of research-based policy proposals, and driving change at a more abstract or general level, such as the conceptualisation of poverty.  Academics can also provide research that people living in poverty and other vulnerable groups can use, empirically-grounded guidance to those who wish to donate to charities, and finally the provision of a “plausible normative framework for thinking about poverty.”

Onora O’Neill, Cambridge philosopher and member of the UK House of Lords, raises questions about the potential of academics to contribute to poverty eradication, noting that many do not have a sufficient level of expertise concerning poverty; she suggests “that it might be better to aim such advocacy not at academics but at the more indeterminate class of persons with expertise relevant to some aspect of poverty and development” (pg. 20). She also remarks that expertise concerning the causes of the persistence of poverty and effective remedies needs to be generated. Roger Riddell (Oxford Policy Management) notes the contributions academics can and have made, and he urges those in groups such as ASAP to be aware of past efforts and their failures as well as successes.

References

External links 
Official website
Facebook page
YouTube page
Twitter Page
Global Poverty Consensus Report

Poverty-related organizations
Non-profit organizations based in Connecticut